The Women's 50 Butterfly event at the 10th FINA World Swimming Championships (25m) took place 16–17 December 2010 in Dubai, United Arab Emirates. The heats and semifinals were swum 16 December; the final on 17 December.

75 swimmers swam the race.

Records
Prior to the competition, the existing world and championship records were as follows.

The following records were established during the competition:

Results

Preliminary heats

 Schreuder scratched the semifinals; therefore 17th-place finisher Schweiger advanced to the semifinals.

Semifinals
Semifinal 1

Semifinal 2

Final

References

Butterfly 050 metre, Women's
World Short Course Swimming Championships
2010 in women's swimming